is a Japanese Greco-Roman wrestler. He competed in the men's Greco-Roman 66 kg event at the 2016 Summer Olympics, in which he lost the bronze medal match to Shmagi Bolkvadze.

References

External links
 

1987 births
Living people
Japanese male sport wrestlers
Olympic wrestlers of Japan
Wrestlers at the 2016 Summer Olympics
20th-century Japanese people
21st-century Japanese people
Asian Wrestling Championships medalists